The Linux kernel is able to run on a variety of devices made by Apple, including ones that are iOS-based where the unlocking of the bootloader is not possible with an official procedure.

iPad 
In June 2022, software developers Konrad Dybcio and Markuss Broks managed to run Linux kernel 5.18 on a iPad Air 2. The project made use of the Alpine Linux based Linux distribution called postmarketOS, which is primarily developed for Android devices. The developer suggested that they used the checkm8 exploit which was published back in 2019.

iPhone 
In 2008, Linux kernel 2.6 was ported to the iPhone 3G, iPhone (1st generation), and iPod Touch (1st generation) using OpeniBoot.

Project Sandcastle made it possible to run Android on an iPhone 7/7+ or an iPod Touch (7th generation).

iPod 

iPodLinux is a Linux distribution created specifically to run on Apple's iPod.

iBook 
Debian can be installed on the Apple iBook.

Mac 
In 2010, Whitson Gordon from Lifehacker noted that Apple has streamlined the process of dual booting Windows on Macs, but not for Linux. rEFIt made it possible to dual boot Linux.

Linux can also be installed on Motorola 68k based Macs.

The Asahi Linux project is porting Linux to the M1 (and up) based SoCs.

See also 
 iBoot
 Cydia
 Linux range of use
 OtherOS
 Linux on IBM Z

References 

Apple Inc.
Linux kernel